Sri Visalakshi Kalasala Higher Secondary School  is located in A. Thekkur, Sivaganga district, Tamil Nadu.

The Sri Visalakshi Kalasala Higher Secondary School was founded on Thursday, 10 July 1947 (a little more than a month before India's Independence), by Kalai Thanthai Karumuttu Thigarajar Chettiar in memory of his wife Annai Thirumathi Visalakshi.

The New School Building was opened on 15 April 1959 by the first Prime Minister of India, Pandit Jawaharlal Nehru.

The school celebrated its Golden Jubilee (50th year) (Tamil: பொன் விழா) on 16 February 1997.

High schools and secondary schools in Tamil Nadu
Education in Sivaganga district
Educational institutions established in 1947
1947 establishments in India